The Essex Scottish was an infantry regiment of the Canadian Army until 1954.

History 
Founded in 1885 as the 21st Essex Battalion of Infantry, it went through several name changes including: 1887 - 21st Battalion, Essex Fusiliers; 1900 - 21st Regiment, Essex Fusiliers; 1920 - The Essex Fusiliers, acquiring its present title in 1927.

During World War II the regiment was among the first Canadian units to see combat in the European theatre during the invasion of Dieppe. By the end of The Dieppe Raid, the Essex Scottish Regiment had suffered 121 fatal casualties, with many others wounded and captured. The Essex Scottish later participated in Operation Atlantic and was slaughtered attempting to take Verrières Ridge on July 21. By the war's end, the Essex Scottish Regiment had suffered over 550 war dead; its 2,500 casualties were the most of any unit in the Canadian army during the Second World War.

In 1954, as a result of the Kennedy Report on the Reserve Army, this regiment was amalgamated with The Kent Regiment to form The Essex and Kent Scottish Regiment.

The Essex Scottish before amalgamation held its final order of precedence as 40.

Alliances and uniform

The Essex Scottish were allied to The Essex Regiment and were kitted with a balmoral with red and white diced border, scarlet doublet, white sporran with two black points, red and black hose, spats with black buttons, blue shoulder straps with white cross stripes and piping with full dress only for pipers and drummers, who also wore a feather bonnet with white hackle.  They wore the red and green tartan of Clan Gregor.

Perpetuations 
The regiment perpetuated the following units of the Canadian Expeditionary Force:

Great War 

 18th Battalion (Western Ontario), CEF
 99th Battalion (Essex), CEF
 241st (Canadian Scottish Borderers) Battalion, CEF

Battle honours

First World War 
Ypres, 1915, '17
Festubert, 1915
Mount Sorrel
Somme, 1916, '18
Flers-Courcelette
Thiepval
Ancre Heights
Arras, 1917, '18
Vimy, 1917
Hill 70
Passchendaele
Amiens
Scarpe, 1918
Hindenburg Line
Canal du Nord
Cambrai, 1918
Pursuit to Mons
France and Flanders 1915–18

Second World War 
Dieppe Raid (1942)
Battle of Verrières Ridge (1944)
liberation of Dieppe (1944)
Battle of the Scheldt (1944)
The Rhine (1944–1945)
Northwestern Europe

Victoria Cross and George Cross recipients
 Major Frederick Albert Tilston VC, Gazetted on 22 May 1945.

See also 

 Canadian-Scottish regiment

References

Barnes, RM, The Uniforms and History of the Scottish Regiments, London, Sphere Books Limited, 1972.

External links
 Veteran Affairs Canada

Essex Scottish Regiment
Highland & Scottish regiments of Canada
Military units and formations of Ontario
Infantry regiments of Canada in World War II
Military units and formations established in 1885
Military units and formations disestablished in 1954